Antrocaryon amazonicum is a species of tree in the cashew family, Anacardiaceae. It is native to Brazil.

References

amazonicum
Trees of the Amazon
Trees of Brazil
Plants described in 1922
Taxa named by Adolpho Ducke